

Hal may refer to:

Places
 Hal, Azerbaijan, a village
 Hal, French name of Halle, Belgium, a city and municipality
 Hal, Elâzığ, Turkey, a village

Arts and entertainment
 Hal (Irish band)
 Hal (Japanese band)
 Hal (2013 film), a Japanese animation
 Hal (2018 film), an American documentary

Other uses
 Hal (given name)
 Hal (Sufism)
 Hal (cuneiform), a sign
 HAL (open archive), a research archive

See also
Harold (disambiguation)
Henry (disambiguation)

es:Hal
nl:Hal
sv:Hal